Phase Two of the Marvel Cinematic Universe (MCU) is a series of American superhero films produced by Marvel Studios based on characters that appear in publications by Marvel Comics. The phase began in 2013 with the release of Iron Man 3 and concluded in 2015 with the release of Ant-Man. It includes the crossover film Avengers: Age of Ultron, also released in 2015. Kevin Feige produced every film in the phase. The six films of the phase grossed over $5.2 billion at the global box office and received generally positive critical and public response.

Chris Evans appeared the most in the phase, starring or making cameo appearances in four of the Phase Two films. Marvel Studios created two more short films for their Marvel One-Shots program to expand the MCU, while each of the feature films received tie-in comic books. Iron Man 3, Thor: The Dark World, and Captain America: The Winter Soldier also received video game tie-ins, while Lego Marvel's Avengers was also released, which adapted the storyline of multiple films of the franchise. Phase Two, along with Phase One and Phase Three, make up The Infinity Saga.

Development 
Following the release of Iron Man 2 (2010), the timing and distribution arrangement of a possible third Iron Man film was brought into question following a conflict between Paramount Pictures, the distributor of previous Marvel Studios films including the first two Iron Man films, and The Walt Disney Company, Marvel Entertainment's then-new corporate parent. On October 18, 2010, Walt Disney Studios agreed to pay Paramount at least $115million for the worldwide distribution rights to Iron Man 3 (2013). The next October, Marvel Studios President Kevin Feige said the studio was beginning to look at the films of the second "phase" of the Marvel Cinematic Universe (MCU), which would start with Iron Man 3 and culminate in a sequel to The Avengers (2012). Feige announced the full slate of Phase Two films at San Diego Comic-Con in July 2012: Iron Man 3, Thor: The Dark World (2013), Captain America: The Winter Soldier (2014), Guardians of the Galaxy (2014), and Avengers: Age of Ultron (2015). In January 2013, Feige stated that Ant-Man (2015) would be the beginning of Phase Three, but later revealed that this had changed and Ant-Man would actually be the final film of Phase Two.

In August 2012, Marvel signed Joss Whedon to an exclusive contract through June 2015 for film and television. With the deal, Whedon would "contribute creatively" on Phase Two of the MCU and develop the first television series set in the universe. In March 2013, Whedon expanded on his consulting responsibilities, saying he would "read the scripts and watch cuts and talk to the directors and writers and give my opinion", while also writing material if needed. Once the story for Avengers: Age of Ultron was approved, Whedon and Marvel Studios were able to examine the other films of the Phase to "really lay it out" so things could be adjusted between the films. Despite this, Whedon did not want to be beholden to the other films of Phase Two because he wanted people to be able to watch Age of Ultron who had not seen the other MCU films since The Avengers. He also found working in television and script doctoring to be "great training ground[s] for dealing with this ... because you're given a bunch of pieces and told to make them fit—even if they don't."

A new Marvel Studios logo was created by Imaginary Forces for Thor: The Dark World, featuring a fanfare composed by The Dark World composer Brian Tyler. Feige explained that a new logo was commissioned for The Dark World since it was the first Marvel Studios film to not also have a distributor logo due to the studio's acquisition by Disney.

Films

Iron Man 3 (2013) 

Tony Stark faces a powerful enemy, the Mandarin, who attacks and destroys his mansion. Left to his own devices and battling posttraumatic stress disorder, Stark struggles to get to the bottom of a series of mysterious explosions.

In late 2010, Marvel and Disney announced that they were developing a third Iron Man film. In February 2011, Marvel hired Shane Black to direct Iron Man 3. Black co-wrote the film's script with Drew Pearce. Robert Downey Jr., Gwyneth Paltrow, and Don Cheadle reprised their roles, with Guy Pearce and Ben Kingsley joining the cast as Aldrich Killian and Trevor Slattery, respectively. Filming began in May 2012, in North Carolina. Additional filming took place in southern Florida, China, and Los Angeles. Iron Man 3 premiered at Le Grand Rex in Paris, France, on April 14, 2013, and at the El Capitan Theatre in Los Angeles, California, on April 24. The film was released internationally on April 25, and in the United States on May 3.

Iron Man 3 is set in December 2012, after the events of The Avengers (2012), with Tony Stark experiencing PTSD-like symptoms following the Battle of New York depicted in that film. Black explained, "that's an anxiety response to feeling inferior to the Avengers, but also to being humbled by sights he cannot possibly begin to understand or reconcile with the realities he's used to... There's a line in the movie about 'ever since that big guy with the hammer fell out of the sky, the rules have changed'. That's what we're dealing with here." Bruce Banner appears in a post-credits scene, with Mark Ruffalo reprising the role from The Avengers. About the scene, Ruffalo said "They were about to wrap the movie and I saw Robert [Downey, Jr.] at the Academy Awards... and he said, 'What do you think about coming and doing a day?' I said, 'Are you kidding me? Bang, let's do it!' We sort of spitballed that scene, then I came in and we shot for a couple of hours and laughed."

Thor: The Dark World (2013) 

Thor reunites with astrophysicist Jane Foster as a series of portals, linking worlds at random, begin to appear. He discovers that Malekith and his army of Dark Elves have returned after thousands of years, and they seek a powerful weapon known as the Aether. Thor must join forces with his now-imprisoned brother Loki to stop them.

A sequel to Thor (2011) was first announced in June of that year, with Chris Hemsworth reprising his role as Thor. Tom Hiddleston confirmed he would return as Loki in September, and Alan Taylor signed on to direct the film in December. The film's title was announced as Thor: The Dark World in July 2012 at the San Diego Comic-Con International, and Christopher Eccleston was cast as Malekith a month later. Production started in September 2012 in Bourne Wood, Surrey, with additional filming taking place in Iceland and London. The film premiered at the Odeon Leicester Square in London on October 22, 2013. It was internationally released on October 30, 2013, and on November 8, 2013, in the United States.

The film is set one year after the events of The Avengers. Chris Evans briefly makes a cameo appearance in the film as Captain America when Loki shapeshifts into him while mocking Thor. Hiddleston wore the Captain America costume while standing in for Evans, before Evans came to shoot the scene. Hiddleston said, "I did an impression of Loki in the Captain America costume, and then they showed Chris [Evans] my performance on tape. It's him doing an impression of me doing an impression of him. And it's brilliant." James Gunn, the director of Guardians of the Galaxy (2014), directed the mid-credits scene that featured the Collector, played by Benicio del Toro. Asked about shooting the scene, Gunn said, "I got the script that morning, and I did it in two hours at the end of a day of second unit shooting [for Guardians of the Galaxy]."

Captain America: The Winter Soldier (2014) 

Steve Rogers, now working with S.H.I.E.L.D., teams up with Natasha Romanoff / Black Widow and Sam Wilson / Falcon to expose a deep conspiracy which involves a mysterious assassin known only as the Winter Soldier.

A sequel to Captain America: The First Avenger (2011) was announced in April 2012. Anthony and Joe Russo were hired to direct in June, and in July it was officially titled Captain America: The Winter Soldier. Evans and Samuel L. Jackson were set to reprise their respective roles as Rogers and Nick Fury, and Scarlett Johansson would again play Romanoff. Sebastian Stan, who portrayed Bucky Barnes in Captain America: The First Avenger, returned as the Winter Soldier. Production started in April 2013 in Manhattan Beach, California, and filming also took place in Washington, D.C. and Cleveland, Ohio. The film premiered in Los Angeles on March 13, 2014. Captain America: The Winter Soldier was released internationally on March 26 and in the United States on April 4.

The film is set two years after the events of The Avengers. Stephen Strange is mentioned by name in the film by the character Jasper Sitwell, with Maximiliano Hernández reprising his role from previous MCU media. A remodeled Stark Tower from The Avengers, now known as Avengers Tower, also makes an appearance in the film. The Avengers director Joss Whedon directed a post-credits scene featuring Baron Wolfgang von Strucker (Thomas Kretschmann), List (Henry Goodman), Pietro Maximoff (Aaron Taylor-Johnson), and Wanda Maximoff (Elizabeth Olsen), who appear in Avengers: Age of Ultron (2015). The revelation in the film that S.H.I.E.L.D. had been infiltrated by Hydra informed the final six episodes of the first season of Agents of S.H.I.E.L.D., a television series set in the MCU.

Guardians of the Galaxy (2014) 

Peter Quill / Star-Lord and a group of misfits, including Gamora, Rocket, Drax the Destroyer and Groot, fight to keep a powerful orb from the clutches of the villainous Ronan.

Nicole Perlman began writing a screenplay in 2009. Marvel Studios announced it was developing a Guardians of the Galaxy film in July 2012. The film is directed by James Gunn, based on his and Perlman's screenplay. In February 2013, Chris Pratt was cast in the lead role, as Peter Quill / Star-Lord. The film was shot at Shepperton Studios and in London from July to October 2013, and post-production work was completed on July 7, 2014. The film premiered on July 21, 2014, in Hollywood. Guardians of the Galaxy was released in the United Kingdom on July 31, 2014, and in the United States on August 1.

The film is set in 2014. Josh Brolin provides the voice and performance capture for Thanos, the supervillain who appeared in The Avengers mid-credits scene. Gunn noted that the film would be connected to Avengers: Infinity War (2018). Several other objects of significance appear in the Collector's museum, including a Chitauri from The Avengers and a Dark Elf from Thor: The Dark World, among other characters. About their appearances Gunn said, "There's a lot of stuff in the Collector's Museum. And for me, it was mostly just really fun. As a Marvel fan, giving the actual fans something that they can freeze frame on their Blu-Ray at home and just kind of pick out everything that's in there. So there are, I mean, seriously all those boxes have something interesting in them, so it's pretty fun." Ronan's race, the Kree, were first introduced in the Agents of S.H.I.E.L.D. episode "T.A.H.I.T.I.".

Avengers: Age of Ultron (2015) 

Captain America, Iron Man, Thor, the Hulk, Black Widow, and Hawkeye must work together as the Avengers to defeat Ultron, a technological enemy bent on human extinction, while encountering the powerful twins Pietro and Wanda Maximoff, as well as the new entity Vision.

A sequel to The Avengers was announced by Disney in May 2012, shortly after the first film's release. In August 2012, Joss Whedon was signed to return as writer and director. In June 2013, Downey signed a deal to reprise the role of Iron Man for the second and third Avengers films. On July 20, 2013, at San Diego Comic-Con International, Whedon announced that the subtitle of the film would be Age of Ultron. In August 2013, James Spader was announced to portray Ultron. Second unit filming began on February 11, 2014, in Johannesburg, South Africa. Principal photography began in March 2014 at Shepperton Studios in Surrey, England, with additional footage filmed at Fort Bard and various other locations in the Aosta Valley region of Italy, and Seoul, South Korea. Filming was completed on August 6, 2014. Avengers: Age of Ultron had its world premiere in Los Angeles on April 13, 2015, and was released internationally beginning April 22, and on May 1 in the United States.

The film confirms that the gem in Loki's scepter is an Infinity Stone, specifically the Mind Stone, and Brolin reappears as Thanos in the mid-credits scene wielding an Infinity Gauntlet. Age of Ultron also features references to vibranium and Wakanda, both connections to Black Panther, introducing both to the universe ahead of the Black Panther film (2018). Additionally, Andy Serkis portrays Ulysses Klaue in the film, traditionally a Black Panther antagonist, and would subsequently appear in Black Panther.

Ant-Man (2015) 

Thief Scott Lang must aid his mentor Dr. Hank Pym in safeguarding the mystery of the Ant-Man technology, which allows its user to decrease in size but increase in strength, from various menaces and plot a heist to defend the Earth.

Ant-Man is directed by Peyton Reed with a screenplay written by Edgar Wright & Joe Cornish and Adam McKay & Paul Rudd, from a story by Wright & Cornish, that includes both Scott Lang and Hank Pym. Edgar Wright was initially slated to direct and write the film, but left the project in May 2014 due to creative differences. In January 2013, Feige stated that Ant-Man would be the first film in Phase Three of the Marvel Cinematic Universe. However, in October 2014, it was revealed that the film would be the last film of Phase Two. Pre-production started in October 2013, and principal photography took place from August to December 2014, in San Francisco, Fayette County, Georgia at Pinewood Atlanta Studios, and Downtown Atlanta. In December 2013, Rudd was cast as Ant-Man, followed in January 2014 with the casting of Michael Douglas as Pym and the confirmation of Rudd as Lang. Ant-Man had its world premiere in Los Angeles on June 29, 2015, and was released in France on July 14, and in the United States on July 17.

The film is set several months after the events of Avengers: Age of Ultron. Hayley Atwell and John Slattery reprise their MCU roles as Peggy Carter and Howard Stark, respectively. Scott Lang attempts to infiltrate the new Avengers headquarters in Upstate New York featured in Age of Ultron, and confronts Sam Wilson / Falcon, played by Anthony Mackie. McKay and Rudd decided to add Wilson to Ant-Man after watching Captain America: The Winter Soldier. The Russo brothers filmed the post-credit scene, which was footage from Captain America: Civil War (2016), and features Mackie as Wilson, Chris Evans as Steve Rogers, and Sebastian Stan as Bucky Barnes.

Short films 

Marvel One-Shots are a series of direct-to-video short films that are included as special features in the MCU films' Blu-ray and digital distribution releases. They are designed to be self-contained stories that provide more backstory for characters or events introduced in the films.

Timeline 

Unlike Phase One, Phase Two was set in relatively real time in order to simplify the timeline of the MCU. Each film was set roughly in real time relating to The Avengers (2012). Iron Man 3 is set around six months later during Christmas, Thor: The Dark World is set one year later, and Captain America: The Winter Soldier is two years after. Guardians of the Galaxy is set explicitly in 2014. Avengers: Age of Ultron and Ant-Man ended the Phase in 2015 and several months passed between the films in-universe as in real life.

The One-Shot Agent Carter is set one year after the events of Captain America: The First Avenger (2011), while All Hail the King takes place after the events of Iron Man 3.

Recurring cast and characters

Music

Film soundtracks

Compilation albums

Home media 

In July 2015, Marvel announced a 13-disc box set titled "Marvel Cinematic Universe: Phase Two Collection", for release on December 8, 2015, exclusive to Amazon.com. The box set includes all six of the Phase Two films on Blu-ray, Blu-ray 3D and a digital copy, in a replica of the Orb from Guardians of the Galaxy, plus a bonus disc and exclusive memorabilia. Material on the bonus disc includes all of the Marvel One-Shots with commentary, deleted scenes and pre-production creative features for each of the films, featurettes on the making of the post-credit scenes for the films, and first looks at Captain America: Civil War, Doctor Strange, and Guardians of the Galaxy Vol. 2.

Reception

Box office performance

Critical and public response

Tie-in media

WHIH Newsfront

WHIH Newsfront is an in-universe current affairs show that serves as a viral marketing campaign for some of the MCU films, created in partnership with Google for YouTube. The campaign is an extension of the fictional news network WHIH World News, which is seen reporting on major events in the MCU. Leslie Bibb reprises her role as Christine Everhart from the Iron Man films. The initial videos released during July 2015 focus on the immediate aftermath of Avengers: Age of Ultron while leading up to the events of Ant-Man, with Corey Stoll and Paul Rudd appearing in their respective roles of Darren Cross and Scott Lang.

Comic books

Video games

Notes

References 

 
Phase 2